Križine is a village in Umag municipality in Istria County, Croatia.

References

Populated places in Istria County